Mario Alberto Quiñones Alarcón (born 20 may 1979), sometimes referred as Mario Quiñonez, is a Chilean former professional footballer who played as a defender for clubs in Chile and Indonesia.

Career
Quiñones played in his country of birth for Coquimbo Unido in the top division from 1999 to 2002 and for Fernández Vial in the Primera B from 2003 to 2004.

Abroad, he played in Indonesia for PSMS Medan, with whom he won the 2005 Piala Emas Bang Yos (Gold Cup Bang Yos). alongside his compatriots Luis Hicks and Alejandro Tobar.

Post-retirement
Quiñones has worked as an adviser of football players in managing of contracts. He made links with Universidad Católica and the ANFP in the area of marketing.

Honours
PSMS Medan
  (Gold Cup Bang Yos):

References

External links
 
 Mario Quiñones at DaltonCarrasco 
 

1979 births
Living people
Place of birth missing (living people)
Chilean footballers
Chilean expatriate footballers
Association football defenders
Chilean Primera División players
Coquimbo Unido footballers
Primera B de Chile players
C.D. Arturo Fernández Vial footballers
Indonesian Premier Division players
PSMS Medan players
Chilean expatriate sportspeople in Indonesia
Expatriate footballers in Indonesia